André de Cortanze (born 30 March 1941) is a French motorsport engineer.

Career
De Cortanze graduated in 1967 with an engineering degree and joined Alpine, a car manufacturer, where he drove and designed racing cars.

He also experienced success in Formula Three and Formula Two and designed a test chassis for Renault's initial foray into Formula One.

In the 1980s, he moved to Peugeot Talbot Sport as Technical Director, enjoying victories in rallying and Le Mans.

In , he moved to the new Sauber F1 team, where he helped design the Sauber C13 and was an engineer at the team during the 1994 Formula One season.

At the start of the season, he was joined by Tim Wright. Wright was only there for a year. 
At the end of 1995, he moved to Ligier, but then moved to Toyota Europe when the team was sold to Alain Prost.

He then designed the 1998-1999 Toyota TS020 (GT-One) that entered the 24 Hours of Le Mans.

In  he became the initial Technical Director of the Toyota F1 team, working with aerodynamicist Robert Choulet.

He currently is the Technical Director of the Pescarolo Sport team.

In 1978 de Cortanze designed a revolutionary 750cc motorcycle which had no orthodox frame. The engine became the frame, with both wheels and suspension being attached to it.

References

1941 births
Living people
Formula One designers
24 Hours of Le Mans drivers
French racing drivers
French motorsport people
World Sportscar Championship drivers
Renault people
12 Hours of Reims drivers

Porsche Motorsports drivers